Alienators: Evolution Continues (also known as Evolution: The Animated Series in some regions) is an animated comic science fiction television series. It is a continuation of the 2001 Ivan Reitman science fiction film, Evolution. 26 episodes were produced.

Created by Louis Gassin, the series is produced by DIC Entertainment, L.P. in association with The Montecito Picture Company, Columbia TriStar Television and Dentsu Inc., the latter of which handled distribution of the series in Asian territories. Although the Evolution intellectual property was owned by DreamWorks (and is now the property of Paramount Pictures which own the studio's pre-2010 live-action back catalog), the series itself is now owned by WildBrain (formerly DHX Media).

The series was the basis for a Game Boy Advance game, that was developed by Digital Eclipse and published by Activision.

Premise 
As with the film, the premise of the series is that a meteor carrying organisms that evolve at a very quick rate crashes into the Arizona Desert; single-celled alien organisms on this meteor quickly evolve into monstrous creatures, dubbed the "Genus". A team of scientists, the Alienators, must eliminate all these creatures before they destroy all life on Earth. The characters, Ira Kane, Harry Block, Lucy Mai, and Wayne Green must study all these extraterrestrial lifeforms and find a way to defeat them all. The "Genus" is led by a "humanoid manifestation" named Scopes.

Characters 
 Scientist Ira Kane – his expertise, along with his excitement and passion about science, helps him lead the team in eliminating the Genus.
 Scientist Harry Block – a coach who always keeps up on game scores, etc., and loves coaching the women's team. His strategies help the team to victory. 
 Lt. Lucy Mai – a tough and aggressive but benevolent lieutenant trained by a Special Forces team called The Blue Berets. She is very talented with martial arts and acrobatic. Lucy uses many kinds of gymnastics (such as handsprings, cartwheels or rolls) in fighting to keep balance and defeat enemies with perfect agility and strength. She is revealed to be a fan of Broadway.
 Teenage "wannabe fireman" Wayne Grey (who's been renamed Wayne Green) – a 17-year-old firefighter-in-training. Being the first human infected with alien DNA, he develops a "sympathetic mutation", causing him to mutate parallel to any Genus strains encountered.
 Scientist Allison Reed has no direct work with the Alienators, but is mentioned a few times, no longer retaining a relationship with Ira like in the movie. She is shown to have no physical training. She can use her knowledge on the fight with Genuses.
 General Russell Woodman is the pompous windbag in charge of giving the alienators missions. 
 G.A.S.S.I.E.: Stands for "Genetically Altered Symbiotic Stasis in Evolution", and is the team's pet. It was an alien cell originally neutralized by Ira. It evolved into Gassie, a slime creature that yips and behaves just as a dog, who can detect and track other Genus creatures. When Gassie detects the Genus, he quivers and emits a foul odor. He is close with Wayne 
 Scopes - the Genus's leader, described as super intelligent, maniacal, arrogant, and intent on taking over the universe. His most common form is as a humanoid octopus, though he's also taken on the form of a humanoid wasp, a humanoid cockroach, a centaur with zebra stripes and eland horns, a humanoid tree, a humanoid fusion of a bull and a horse, an organic gargoyle, a humanoid spider, an octopus fused with a wendigo, and more. His name is a reference to the Scopes trial.
 General Granger - an arrogant and treacherous general who seeks to use the Genus to conquer Earth, eventually becoming Scopes' pawn.
 Deke and Derrick

Cast
 Mark Acheson as SCOPES
 Andrew Francis as Wayne Green
 Fiona Hogan as Dr. Allison Reed
 Cusse Mankuma as Harry Block
 Akiko Ann Morison as Lt. Lucy Mai
 Kirby Morrow as Ira Kane
 John Payne
 Lee Tockar

Additional

 Tony Alcantar
 Kathleen Barr
 Jim Byrnes
 Joely Collins
 Bernard Cuffling
 Deborah Demille
 Maria Louisa Figura
 Colin Foo
 Mackenzie Gray
 Kim Hawthorne
 Mark Hildreth
 Adrian Holmes

 Kristie Marsden
 Maxine Miller
 Richard Newman
 Manny Petruzzelli
 Taylor-Anne Reid
 Alvin Sanders
 Peter Shinkoda
 Chantal Strand
 Samuel Vincent
 Dale Wilson
 Lenore Zann

Episodes

Production 
In 2001, DIC picked up the animation rights to produce an animated series based on the film. Fox Kids acquired the North American broadcast rights and ordered 26 episodes to be produced for the Fall of 2001. The series premiered in September.

The same year in June, Lions Gate Home Entertainment signed a home media distribution deal DIC Entertainment which included Alienators.

In September, DIC signed an alliance agreement with Dentsu, the latter of which would invest, partner and co-produce the series with DIC in exchange for Asian and Japanese distribution rights excluding India.

Broadcast
In September 2001, YTV acquired Canadian broadcast rights to the series under a deal with DIC Entertainment.

Home releases 
In the United States, Lions Gate Home Entertainment and Trimark Home Video released Evolution: The Animated Movie on VHS and DVD on January 29, 2002. This release consisted of the 3-part episode "Survival" in a feature-length format. It was re-released by Sterling Entertainment on November 13, 2003 with the DVD version containing the fourth episode "Don't Drink the Water" as a bonus feature. The entire series is also available on Amazon Video.

In the United Kingdom, Anchor Bay UK released a single DVD/VHS set of the series on June 28, 2004 containing the first four episodes and later on released another DVD containing the next four. Avenue Entertainment would also release 2 DVDs containing 2 episodes each.

In Japan, six VHS/DVD releases, consisting of the entire series, was released in Japan by Happinet in January 2003. These sets were later released as part of two boxsets.

References

External links 
 

2000s American animated television series
2001 American television series debuts
2002 American television series endings
2000s French animated television series
2001 French television series debuts
2002 French television series endings
Fox Kids
Fox Broadcasting Company original programming
Television shows adapted into video games
Television series by DIC Entertainment
Television series by Sony Pictures Television
Evolution in popular culture
Animated television shows based on films
American children's animated comic science fiction television series
French children's animated comic science fiction television series
Television series by DHX Media